Leptestheriidae is a family of crustaceans in the order Spinicaudata. They are distinguished from the family Cyzicidae by the presence of a rostral spine. Members of Leptestheriidae are believed to graze on detritus.

The family contains five extant genera:
 Eoleptestheria
 Leptestheria
 Leptestheria compleximanus
 Leptestheriella
 Maghrebestheria
 Sewellestheria

References

Spinicaudata
Crustacean families